Intel Extreme Masters Season IX was the ninth season of Intel Extreme Masters competitions organized by Electronic Sports League, and took place between July 2014 and March 2015. The season included five stops in different cities around the world acting as qualifiers before culminating in the World Championship in Katowice, Poland. The featured games were League of Legends by Riot Games and StarCraft II: Heart of the Swarm, as well as one competition of Hearthstone: Heroes of Warcraft, both by Blizzard Entertainment.

Shenzhen 
Intel Extreme Masters Shenzhen was the opening event of Season IX, and took place between July 16–20 at the Shenzhen Cartoon and Animation Festival in Shenzhen, China. The event featured three games: StarCraft II, League of Legends, and Hearthstone: Heroes of Warcraft in its sole Intel Extreme Masters appearance of the season. The prize pools consisted of US$25,000, US$5,000 and US$10,000 respectively, as well as 4,000 StarCraft II World Championship Series (WCS) points spread among the participants based on their placing.

Hearthstone: Heroes of Warcraft

League of Legends

StarCraft II 

Source: Intel Extreme Masters

Toronto

StarCraft II 

Source: Intel Extreme Masters

San Jose

League of Legends

StarCraft II 

Source: Intel Extreme Masters

Cologne

League of Legends 

Source: Intel Extreme Masters

Taipei

League of Legends

StarCraft II 

Source: Intel Extreme Masters

World Championship – Katowice

League of Legends

StarCraft II 

Source: Intel Extreme Masters

References

External links 
 

2014 in esports
2015 in esports
Intel Extreme Masters
League of Legends competitions
StarCraft competitions